This is an incomplete list of artists represented in the National Museum of Western Art, Tokyo.

Heinrich Aldegrever (1502–1561), Germany
Albrecht Altdorfer (1480–1538), Germany
Edmond Aman-Jean (1860–1936), France
Jean Arp (1886–1966), France
Hans Baldung Grien (1484–1554), Germany
Giovanni Francesco Barbieri (1591–1666), Italy
Ernst Barlach (1870–1938), Germany
Leandro Bassano (1557–1622), Italy
Barthel Beham (1502–1540), Germany
Hans Sebald Beham (1500–1550), Germany
Stefano della Bella (1610–1664), Italy
Émile Bernard (1868–1941), France
Paul-Albert Besnard (1849–1934), France
Joachim Beuckelaer (1533–1574), Belgium
Leonardo Bistolfi (1859–1933), Italy
William Blake (1757–1827), UK
Jacques-Emile Blanche (1861–1942), France
Abraham Bloemaert (1564–1651), Netherlands
Cornelis Bloemaert (1603–1684), Netherlands
Pierre Bonnard (1867–1947), France
François Bonvin (1817–1887), France
Abraham Bosse (1602–1676), France
François Boucher (1703–1770), France
Emile-Antoine Bourdelle (1861–1929), France
Dierick Bouts (1420–1475), Netherlands
Félix Bracquemond (1833–1914), France
Georges Braque (1882–1963), France
Pieter Brueghel (1525–1569), Belgium
Hendrick ter Brugghen (1588–1629), Netherlands
Charles Le Brun (1619–1690), France
Bernard Buffet (1928–1999), France
Hans Burgkmair (1473–1531), Germany
Jacques Callot (1592–1635), France
Giulio Campagnola (1482–1516), Italy
Robert Campbell (1944–1993), Australia
Canaletto (1697–1768), Italy
Agostino Carracci (1557–1602), Italy
Jean-Baptiste Carpeaux (1827–1875), France
Eugène Carrière (1849–1906), France
Bernardo Cavallino (1616–1654), Italy
Paul Cézanne (1839–1906), France
Marc Chagall (1887–1985), France
Joos van Cleve (1480–1540), Germany
Charles-Nicolas Cochin (1688–1754), France
Edwaert Collier (1640–1707), Netherlands
Gillis van Coninxloo (1544–1606), Belgium
Lovis Corinth (1858–1925), Romania
Jean-Baptiste-Camille Corot (1796–1875), France
Charles Cottet (1863–1925), France
Gustave Courbet (1819–1877), France
Charles Antoine Coysevox (1640–1720), France
Lucas Cranach the Elder (1472–1553), Germany
Carlo Crivelli (1430–1494), Italy
Salvador Dalí (1904–1989), Spain
Charles-François Daubigny (1817–1878), France
Honoré Daumier (1808–1879), France
Alexandre Gabriel Decamps (1803–1860), France
Edgar Degas (1834–1917), France
Eugène Delacroix (1798–1863), France
Maurice Denis (1870–1943), France
André Derain (1880–1954), France
George Desvallières (1861–1950), France
Carlo Dolci (1616–1686), Italy
Kees van Dongen (1877–1968), Netherlands
Gerrit Dou (1613–1675), Netherlands
Jean Dubuffet (1901–1985), France
Raoul Dufy (1877–1953), France
Jean Duvet (1485–1570), France
Anthony van Dyck (1599–1641), Belgium
Albrecht Dürer (1471–1528), Germany
James Ensor (1860–1949), Belgium
Max Ernst (1891–1976), Germany
William Etty (1787–1849), UK
Henri Fantin-Latour (1836–1904), France
Lyonel Feininger (1871–1956), US
Georges de Feure (1868–1943), France
Copley Fielding (1787–1855), UK
Jean-Louis Forain (1852–1931), France
Tsuguharu Foujita (1886–1968), Japan
Jean-Honoré Fragonard (1732–1806), France
Sam Francis (1923–1994), US
Paul Gauguin (1848–1903), France
Claude Gellée (1600–1682), France
Jacques de Gheyn II (1565–1629), Belgium
Giorgio Ghisi (1512–1582), Italy
Alberto Giacometti (1901–1966), Switzerland
Albert Gleizes (1881–1953), France
Vincent van Gogh (1853–1890), Netherlands
Hendrick Goltzius (1558–1616), Germany
Francisco de Goya (1746–1828), Spain
Jan van Goyen (1596–1656), Netherlands
El Greco (1541–1614), Greece
Richard Hamilton (1922–2011), UK
Cornelis de Heem (1631–1695), Netherlands
Jean-Jacques Henner (1829–1905), France
Auguste Herbin (1882–1960), France
William Hogarth (1697–1764), UK
Hans Holbein (1497–1543), Germany
Jean-Auguste-Dominique Ingres (1780–1876), France
Tim Johnson (born 1947), Australia
Jacob Jordaens (1593–1678), Belgium
Wassily Kandinsky (1866–1944), Russia
Max Klinger (1857–1920), Germany
Käthe Kollwitz (1867–1945), Germany
Alfred Kubin (1877–1959), Germany
Nicolas Lancret (1690–1743), France
Nicolas de Largillière (1665–1746), France
Jean Launois (1898–1942), France
Ernest Laurent (1859–1929), France
Le Corbusier (1887–1965), Switzerland
Bernard Leach (1887–1979), Hong Kong
Henri Lebasque (1865–1937), France
Fernand Léger (1881–1955), France
Alphonse Legros (1837–1911), France
Stanislas Lépine (1835–1892), France
Lucas van Leyden (1489–1533), Netherlands
Léon Augustin Lhermitte (1844–1925), France
Pietro Longhi (1702–1785), Italy
Alessandro Magnasco (1667–1749), Italy
Aristide Maillol (1861–1944), France
Édouard Manet (1832–1883), France
Andrea Mantegna (1431–1506), Italy
Henri Matisse (1869–1954), France
Charles Meryon (1821–1868), France
John Everett Millais (1829–1896), UK
Jean-François Millet (1814–1875), France
Joan Miró (1893–1983), Spain
Paula Modersohn-Becker (1876–1907), Germany
Amedeo Modigliani (1884–1920), Italy
Claude Monet (1840–1926), France
Bartolomeo Montagna (1440–1523), Italy
Adolphe Joseph Thomas Monticelli (1824–1886), France
Henry Moore (1898–1986), UK
Gustave Moreau (1826–1898), France
Sally Morgan (born 1951), Australia
Alphonse Mucha (1860–1939), Czechoslovakia
 Edvard Munch (1863–1944), Norway
 Bartolomé Esteban Murillo (1618–1682), Spain
Jean-Marc Nattier (1685–1766), France
Robert Owen (born 1937), Australia
Arturo Pacheco Altamirano (1903–1978), Chile
Samuel Palmer (1805–1881), UK
George Papazov (1894–1972), Bulgaria
Mike Parr (born 1945), Australia
Jules Pascin (1885–1930), Bulgaria
Jean-Baptiste Pater (1695–1736), France
Joachim Patinir (1475–1524), Belgium
Pablo Picasso (1881–1973), Spain
Francesco Piranesi (1778–1810), Italy
Giovanni Battista Piranesi (1720–1778), Italy
Camille Pissarro (1830–1903), US
Jackson Pollock (1912–1956), US
Paulus Pontius (1603–1858), Belgium
Pierre Puvis de Chavannes (1824–1898), France
Odilon Redon (1840–1916), France
Guido Reni (1575–1642), Italy
Pierre-Auguste Renoir (1841–1919), France
Alfred Rethel (1816–1959), Germany
Joshua Reynolds (1723–1792), UK
José de Ribera (1591–1652), Spain
Rembrandt van Rijn (1606–1669), Netherlands
Henri Rivière (1864–1951), France
Hubert Robert (1733–1808), France
Auguste Rodin (1840–1917), France
Félicien Rops (1833–1898), Belgium
Salvatore Rosa (1615–1673), Italy
Dante Gabriel Rossetti (1828–1882), UK
Georges Rouault (1871–1958), France
Peter Paul Rubens (1577–1640), Germany
Ed Ruscha (born 1937), US
Jacob van Ruisdael (1630–1681), Netherlands
Egidius Sadeler (1570–1629), Belgium
Francesco Salviati (1510–1563), Italy
Ary Scheffer (1795–1858), Netherlands
Martin Schongauer (1450–1491), France
Cornelis Schut (1597–1655), Belgium
Giovanni Segantini (1858–1899), Italy
Daniel Seghers (1590–1661), Belgium
Jacopo del Sellaio (1442–1493), Italy
Paul Sérusier (1864–1927), France
Ben Shahn (1898–1969), US
Paul Signac (1863–1935), France
Alfred Sisley (1839–1899), France
John Sloan (1871–1951), US
Chaïm Soutine (1893–1943), Romania
Jan Steen (1626–1679), Netherlands
Herman van Swanevelt (1600–1655), Netherlands
David Teniers the Younger (1610–1690), Belgium
David Teniers the Elder (1582–1649), Belgium
Giovanni Battista Tiepolo (1696–1770), Italy
Giovanni Domenico Tiepolo (1727–1804), Italy
Jacopo Tintoretto (1518–1594), Italy
Jan Toorop (1858–1928), Netherlands
Henri de Toulouse-Lautrec (1864–1901), France
Georges de La Tour (1593–1653), France
Joseph Mallord William Turner (1775–1851), UK
Adriaen van Utrecht (1599–1653), Belgium
Armand Vaillancourt (born 1929), Canada
Félix Vallotton (1865–1925), Czechoslovakia
Giorgio Vasari (1511–1574), Italy
Agostino Veneziano (1490–1536), Italy
Claude Joseph Vernet (1714–1789), France
Paolo Veronese (1528–1588), Italy
Jacques Villon (1875–1963), France
Maurice de Vlaminck (1876–1958), France
Heinrich Vogeler (1872–1942), Germany
Lucas Vorsterman (1595–1675), Netherlands
Marten de Vos (1532–1603), Belgium
Édouard Vuillard (1868–1940), France
Rogier van der Weyden (1399–1464), Belgium
James McNeill Whistler (1834–1903), US
 Richard Wilson (1714–1782), UK

References

National Museum of Western Art, Tokyo
Art museums and galleries in Tokyo